Sharon Speedway is a 3/8-mile dirt oval race track located in Hartford Township, Ohio and named for the nearby city of Sharon, Pennsylvania. It opened in 1929, making it one of the oldest continuously running dirt ovals in the United States. The track is currently part-owned and operated by the Blaney family, which includes NASCAR driver Dave Blaney.  Blaney's father and former driver, Lou Blaney, originally assisted in the operation of the track.  Lou Blaney died on January 25, 2009.

The track currently hosts several major touring series including the World of Outlaws Late Model Series and even hosted a NASCAR Grand National race in 1954.  It was a 200-lap event in which Lee Petty held off Buck Baker and Herb Thomas for the win. Rusty Wallace, Tom Sneva, Tony Stewart, Lee Petty, Clint Bowyer, Kevin Harvick, Chase Elliott, Dave Blaney, and Dave's son Ryan are among drivers who have competed at the racetrack.

Current season 
The Sharon Speedway will host the All Star Circuit of Champions in the 2022 season. They will also be holding a 2 day ASCoC event on September 2nd and 3rd for the return of the Sharon Nationals.

Sharon will also host the season finale to the 2022 SRX Series, being broadcast live on CBS, with both father and son, Dave Blaney and Ryan Blaney, in the race.

References

External links
Official Site

Other Local Tracks
Mercer Raceway Park
Tri-City Speedway
Pittsburgh's Pennsylvania Motor Speedway
Lernerville Speedway
Motorsport venues in Ohio
NASCAR tracks
Buildings and structures in Trumbull County, Ohio
Tourist attractions in Trumbull County, Ohio
1929 establishments in Ohio
Sports venues completed in 1929